Karl Gustaf Torsten Sjögren (30 January 1896 – 27 July 1974) was a Swedish psychiatrist and geneticist. He was born in Södertälje and died in Gothenburg. In Stockholm, he graduated as a licentiate of medicine in 1925, and in 1931 he became doctor of medicine and a docent of psychiatry at Lund university. Torsten Sjögren was the chairman of the International Federation of Eugenic Organizations in the late 1930s. According to Stefan Kühl in For the Betterment of the Race (originally Die Internationale der Rassiten 1997), Sjögren was submissive to the Nazi party with their increasingly controversial views on eugenics, which contributed to the disintegration of the organization in the latter half of the 1930s. Torsten Sjögren was professor of psychiatry at the Karolinska Institute from 1945 to 1961. He was elected a member of the Royal Swedish Academy of Sciences in 1951.
Sjögren–Larsson syndrome is named after him (along with Tage Larsson) as well as Marinesco–Sjögren syndrome.

He was also involved in the characterization of juvenile neuronal ceroid lipofuscinosis.

References

1896 births
1974 deaths
Swedish psychiatrists
Swedish geneticists
Academic staff of the Karolinska Institute
Members of the Royal Swedish Academy of Sciences